Latin Contrasts (also released as Brazilliance Vol. 3) is an album by saxophonist Bud Shank with arrangements by Laurindo Almeida first released on the World Pacific label in 1959.

Reception

AllMusic rated the album with 3 stars.

Track listing
All compositions by Laurindo Almeida, except as indicated.
 "Harlem Samba" - 2:26
 "North of the Border" - 2:38
 "Sunset Baion" - 2:04
 "'Round Midnight" (Thelonious Monk, Bernie Hanighen, Cootie Williams) - 3:54
 "Toro Dance" (Bud Shank) - 2:52
 "Serenade for Alto" - 3:35
 "Xana-Lyn" (Shank) - 3:28
 "Blowing Wild" (Dmitri Tiomkin, Paul Francis Webster) - 3:30
 "Gershwin Prelude" (George Gershwin) - 3:28
 "Frio Y Color" (Shank) - 3:20

Personnel 
Bud Shank - alto saxophone, flute
Laurindo Almeida - guitar
Gary Peacock - bass
Chuck Flores - drums

References 

1959 albums
World Pacific Records albums
Bud Shank albums